American actress Marilyn Monroe's life and persona have been depicted in film, television, music, the arts, and by other celebrities.

Advertising

 Absolut Vodka "Absolut Marilyn" (1995): by Chiat/Day.
 America250 "Public Service Announcement" (2021): Monroe is showcased as one of the iconic figures in American history as it pledges to reaffirm this spirit as the country approaches its 250th birthday.
 Antifom: Marilyn (2008): A print ad from Venezuela with a woman dressed as Monroe during the famous subway grate pose from The Seven Year Itch. 
 Appenzeller Käse (2021): Monroe appears in the ad for the cheese brand from Switzerland played by Monroe's lookalike Suzie Kennedy.
 Bavaria (2014): Monroe hangs out with other dead celebrities on a desert island such as Elvis Presley, Tupac Shakur, Bruce Lee, Kurt Cobain and John Lennon.
 Bentley Baths (2012): A local commercial for their walk-in style bathtubs featuring an appearance by Monroe in her signature Seven Year Itch outfit.
 Big Sexy Hair: Marilyn Monroe (2013) Monroe is the poster girl in the ads.
 Born This Way Foundation: "Pages" (2013) a brief video clip of Monroe can be seen in the ad.
 CBS: "The Nanny" (1998) in a brief ID bumper for her hit sitcom The Nanny, Fran Drescher (a.k.a. Fran Fine) in a black dress pays homage to Monroe and The Seven Year Itch by doing the famous "subway grate" posellac
 Cadillac: "Carry" (2017) An old pic of Monroe posing with her black Cadillac can be briefly seen in this commercial.
 Československá obchodní banka: "Marilyn" (2008) by MUW Saatchi & Saatchi
 Chanel No. 5:
 (1994) Carole Bouquet morphs into Monroe
 (2013) "It's the Truth" commercial
 Chevrolet: "See the USA in Your Chevrolet" (1999) Monroe can be briefly seen blowing a kiss on the big screen at a drive-in movie theater
 Christian Dior: "J'adore" perfume (2011) featuring Charlize Theron
 Citibank: "The Ex" (2012) featuring Giada De Laurentiis, and Alicia Keys
 Citroën: "DS3" (2010)
 Coca-Cola (1953): Monroe's scenes from the 1951 film Love Nest were spliced into Coke Time with Eddie Fisher a 15-minute show that aired on Wednesday and Friday from 1953 until 1957. The show was sponsored by Coca-Cola and would feature celebrities praising the soda.
 Dolce & Gabbana: (2009) with Scarlett Johansson
 Dean's Finest Old Scotch Whisky "Surprisingly Mild" (2010): a Scotsman apes the "subway grate" pose as a parody of The Seven Year Itch.
 DSW: "The Savvy Shoe Lovers" (2013), a woman apes the "subway grate" pose from The Seven Year Itch
 Emporio Armani: Diamonds "Can You Resist?" (2007) Beyoncé sings an updated version of Diamonds Are a Girl's Best Friend from Gentlemen Prefer Blondes
 Fiat: "Fiat Nuova 500" (2007)
 Fit Light Yogurt "Marilyn Monroe" (2007): an overweight woman dresses as Monroe from The Seven Year Itch.
 Ford Focus "Attraction" (2009): a light graffiti figure transforms into Monroe who tries to attract the attention of the car.
 FOX Nation: 
"Breaking News" (2020) Monroe can be seen in the green room with a bald eagle, an astronaut and a country music star named John Rich, featuring an appearance by Abby Hornacek.
"It's Crime Time" (2020) A newspaper article with the headline "Marilyn Dead" can be seen in the ad This was to promote Scandalous: The Death of Marilyn Monroe.
 Gap: "Gap khakis" (1993)
 Giovanni Rana (1997): Rana is put into one of Monroe's classic 1953 film How to Marry a Millionaire.
 Go Daddy: Super Bowl XLIV (2010) Danica Patrick apes Monroe
 Grolsch Premium Blond (2007): Featuring vintage film reels of Monroe while she sings "I wanna be loved by You".
 Guinness (2004): features a recreation of the scene from Some Like it Hot.
 Holsten Pils (1988): The ad features comedian Griff Rhys-Jones riffing with Monroe.
 Hoppe Jonge Jenever (1987): A Dutch ad for the juniper-flavored spirit features Monroe from The Seven Year Itch posing on a plane along with a brief cameo appearance by Humphrey Bogart talking to her.
 HSBC: "Marilyn" (2008) by JWT
 Hubba Bubba: interactive poster (2008) by DDB Sydney
 Iberia (2002): Monroe appears on the screen while babies are watching her.
 Imperial Chemical Industries-Dulux: "Paint" (2005)
 Ivi Fusion "Secret Baby" (2007) by BBDO Athens Monroe and Albert Einstein finds out what would it be like if they had a child.
 Jeep: "Portraits" (2016) Monroe is one of the iconic black and white portraits throughout its history in celebration of its 75th Anniversary. According to the tagline, it clearly states that "We Don't Make Jeep, You Do!"
 Jeep Wrangler 4xe "Pale Blue Dot" (2020): A brief clip of Monroe at the army riding in a Jeep blowing a kiss at the camera can be seen in the commercial.
 Levi Strauss & Co.: "Our Models Can Beat Up Your Models" (1998) by Chiat/Day
 Library of Congress: "Library of Congress Experience" (2008)
 M&M: "Marilyn" (2008): the green M&M tries to mimic Monroe's voice.
 MasterCard: "Break in Your Jeans" (2009) by McCann Erickson 
 Match-Ems Gummies: "Extra Hands" (2018) Monroe's pink gloved hand from Gentlemen Prefer Blondes holding a blue gummy on the left side can briefly be seen in the beginning. 
 Mercedes-Benz: "GLK-Class" (2008)
 Müller Corner: (1997) In the "Candy Corner" segment of the advert, former star of the hit British sitcom Absolutely Fabulous (or abbreviated as Ab Fab) Dame Joanna Lumley (who's mostly well known for playing Patsy Stone) in a matching blue dress and gloves does a brief tribute to "Diamonds are a Girl's Best Friend" from Gentlemen Prefer Blondes. According to her, it was dubbed as your "glitzy, glitzy, extravagant side!" where she wants to be flown in the air by a group of men in white tuxedos but is accidentally dropped in the process. (NOTE: She does not sing at all)
 Nair: Windy Dresses (1992) three women(in colorful neon dresses) have a Seven Year Itch-like satire on a boat.
 NET Serviços: TV campaign (2002)
 Nike: "Dialogue" (1991) by Wieden+Kennedy
 Pepsi Wild Cherry: "Explosively Cherry" (2014) A Brunette woman's white dress with cherry patterns briefly billows quickly after a man pops the cap off a bottle of the soda. Then, the cherry patterns start to fizzle away or dissolve as the guy drinks the beverage
 Pond's (2012): When a girl  attempts to emulate the timeless Monroe, only one thing stops her from making the trademark 'beauty spot'.
 Procter & Gamble: Tampax (2006) by Vitruvio/Leo Burnett
 Reckitt Benckiser: Veet Hair Removal Cream (2006) by JWT Brazil
 Roberto Cavalli: Spring collection (2009) with Daria Werbowy 
 Royal Triton Motor Oil (1950): The one and only commercial Monroe made in her lifetime.
 RT Edwards (2014): Monroe sings "Happy Birthday" for its 80th anniversary.
 Sazka "Subway" (2007): This mainly features a group of kids who are under a subway in a flatulence contest, but it does feature a brief parody of The Seven Year Itch up top.
 Science World: "We Can Explain" (2006) by Rethink
 Scope "I Wanna Be Loved By You" (1999): The song is used in this commercial for the mouthwash brand. 
 Sexy Hair "Sexy is Forever" (2014): a model dubbed as "the modern Marilyn" is interspersed with Milton Greene's photos of the star and some of her quotes.
 Sierra Mist: "Where's Wallace? Featuring Patton Oswalt" (2004) a parade of Scottish bagpipers fills the screen. All were sweating. Suddenly several are inquiring "Where's Wallace?" as his bagpipe is seen lying on the pavement. The camera pans to Wallace (Oswalt) standing over a subway vent, his kilt blowing as high as Marilyn Monroe's famous white dress in The Seven Year Itch with a look of relief on his face. 
 Snickers: "You're Not You When You're Hungry" (2016) by BBDO, Willem Dafoe morphs into Monroe before shooting The Seven Year Itch skirt-blowing scene
 Sony Beta (1981): A print ad featuring Andy Warhol & Monroe on TV.
 Sony Cybershot: "Marilyn" (2011): The ad crops a photo of Monroe from her 1956 trip to England as it pans out to a reimagined scene having caused a car accident.
 Star in the Star (2021): In this promo for the Italian talent & variety show, Monroe on the red carpet unmasked herself by revealing to be model, showgirl, television personality and former child actress Ilary Blasi.
 Sunsilk: "Life Can't Wait" (2008)
 Takara: "April 1984 Spread" Monroe's legs from The Seven Year Itch can be seen in this range ad of games.
 TCM: A maid comes into Monroe's room to check up on her, but she wakes up as the maid leaves her room.
 Trivial Pursuit: "Marilyn Manson-Monroe" by Publicis Machine Johannesburg advertising agency (2015) "Rock singer Marilyn Manson's head is attached to Marilyn Monroe's body".
 Unilever: Close-Up Toothpaste (2001) by JWT
 United States Postage Stamps: "Popeye & Marilyn Monroe" (1995): Monroe is featured on a postage stamp
 Univision: "Monroe It" (2002) a blonde woman in a red dress gets it blown high
 Visa: "Signature Card" (2004) by BBDO
 Volkswagen: (2004)
 Yarra Trams: (2009) a cheeky take on Monroe's famous scene from The Seven Year Itch, as she leaves the scene a Scotsman takes over but no air from the vent comes up
 Yuhan: Rapicold (2006) by Diamond Ogilvy
 Zales Marilyn Monroe Collection: "I Am My Own Muse", "Valentine's Day: You Are My Icon", "Holidays: You Are My Icon" (2019-2020): These three commercials showcases its exclusive collection that were inspired by actress, entrepreneur and timeless icon.

Architecture
 Absolute World: Building #4 and Building #5 are nicknamed "Marilyn Monroe"

Art
 Nils Aas: Marilyn Monroe (1992), Haugesund, Norway 
 William Anastasi: Untitled (1995), and Untitled (1996)
 Clive Barker: MM (1999)
 Peter Hill Beard: Marilyn Monroe (1972)
 Pierre Bellocq: Canvas of Stars mural for Gallagher's Steak House (2006)
 Maurice Bennett: Marilyn Monroe (2011)
 Pierre Bismuth:
 Following the Right Hand of Marilyn Monroe in Some Like It Hot (2005)
 Following the Right Hand of Marilyn Monroe in The Misfits (2006)
 Peter Blake:
 Marilyn Monroe Over a Painting No 1 (1989–1990)
 Marilyn Monroe Wall No 2, "MM Red Yellow" (1990)
 M for Marilyn Monroe
 H.O.M.A.G.E. (1991)
 Pauline Boty: The Only Blonde in the World (1963) 
 Charles Bragg: Chasen's Jockey Club
 Marcel Broodthaers: Tour Marilyn (1965)
 Erik Bulatov: Marilyn (2000)
 Philip Burke: Marilyn Monroe (2003)
 Silvano Campeggi:
 Marilyn Monroe (1957)
 Nano in Marilyn's Eyes (2000)
 Reginald Case:
 Tropical Marilyn
 First Version X and Flowers
 Marilyn-Green Dress
 Christo: Wrapped Magazine Marilyn (1962)
 Bruce Conner: Marilyn Times Five
 Salvador Dalí:
 Self-Portrait (1967)
 Mao Monroe (1972)
 Marilyn Monroe installation
 Allan D'Arcangelo:
 Marilyn (1962)
 Marilyn Found (1962)
 Olivia De Berardinis:
 Marilyn Monroe Nude (1990)
 Marilyn (1991)
 Poofie Print IV
 Jerry De La Cruz: Monroe (2002)
 Willem de Kooning: Marilyn Monroe (1954)
 Devon Dikeou: Marilyn Monroe Wanted to be Buried in Pucci installation (2008)
 Dolk: Pope Benedict XVI as Marilyn Monroe (2011)
 Erró:
 Daydream
 The Forgotten Future
 House of Gore
 Not Far Enough
 Your Love Don't Pay My Bills
 Sad Movies Make Me Cry (2001)
 Jim Evans: Marilyn Monroe (1991)
 Shepard Fairey: Marilyn Warhol (2000)
 Charles Fazzino:
 Forever Marilyn (1998)
 Love and Kisses, Marilyn (2008)
 Audrey Flack: Marilyn: Golden Girl (1978)
 Howard Finster: Marilyn Monroe (1999)
 James Gill:
 Marilyn Tryptych (1962) 
 Pink Marilyn (2008)
 Douglas Gordon: Self-Portrait as Kurt Cobain as Andy Warhol as Myra Hindley as Marilyn Monroe (1996)
 Vladimir Gorsky: Marilyn Monroe
 Richard Hamilton: My Marilyn (1966)
 Keith Haring: Marilyn Monroe (1981)
 Margaret Harrison: Anonymous Was a Woman From Rosa Luxemburg to Janis Joplin (1977)
 Gottfried Helnwein:
 Boulevard of Broken Dreams (1984)
 Marilyn (1992)
 Al Hirschfeld: 
 1954 Movies (1954)
 Gish, Sorrel & Monroe (1954)
 Gregory Peck (1954)
 Lana Turner, Marilyn Monroe & Ava Gardner (1954)
 Marilyn Monroe (1955)
 Mural for the Eden Roc Miami Beach Hotel (1955)
 Talent Takes Over (1957)
 Some Like It Hot (1959)
 The Misfits (1960)
 Marilyn Monroe - Some Like It Hot (1969)
 George Cukor (1972)
 World Premier (1975)
 Marilyn Monroe - Seven Year Itch (1983)
 There's No Biz Like Show Biz (1988)
 Abe Hirschfeld (1988)
 Marilyn Monroe (1988)
 Marilyn (Umbrella) Monroe (1989)
 Marilyn Monroe (1989)
 A&E Biography (1997)
 The Misfits (1999)
 Jerry Schwartz with Marilyn Monroe (2000)
 Marilyn (Happy Birthday, Mr. President) Monroe (2002) 
 Jonathan Horowitz: Talking Without Thinking (2001)
 Robert Indiana:
 The Metamorphosis of Norma Jean (1998)
 Marilyn, Marilyn (1999)
 Sunburst Marilyn (2001)
 John Seward Johnson II: Forever Marilyn (2011)
 Ray Johnson: Dear Marilyn Monroe (1972)
 Dear Marilyn Monroe/Chuck Close (1980)
 Allen Jones: Marilyn Monroe (1960–1961)
 Steve Kaufman:
 Marilyn Monroe State (1995–1999)
 Pop Marilyn
 Barbara Kruger: Not Stupid Enough (1997)
 Sebastian Krüger: Marilyn Monroe
 David LaChapelle: Amanda Lepore as Andy Warhol's Marilyn (2007)
 Jean-Jacques Lebel: Taking a Real Good Peek at Marilyn's Amazing Offer (1961)
 Zoe Leonard: Marilyn (1990–1995)
 Richard Lindner: Marilyn Was Here (1970)
 Gina Lollobrigida: My Friend, Marilyn Monroe (2003)
 Bob Mackie: Marilyn Monroe (1977)
 Christopher Makos:
 Andy Warhol Looks Like Marilyn Monroe (1982)
 Andy Warhol 'I'm Not Marilyn Monroe'  (1982)
 Altered Images (1982)
 Louis Marchetti: Marilyn Monroe
 Derek Marlowe: A Slight Misfit (1962) 
 Stanley Meltzoff: Our Nation's 200th Birthday, The Telephone's 100th Birthday (1976) for Bell System
 Earl Moran: Lady in the Light (1945)
 Yasumasa Morimura:
 Self Portrait (1995)
 Red Marilyn (1995)
 Mr. Brainwash:
 Marilyn Monroe (2008)
 Spock/Marilyn Monroe (2009)
 Andy Warhol/Marilyn Monroe (2009)
 Nolita mural (2010)
 Vik Muniz:
 Marilyn (after Andy Warhol) (2001)
 Bloody Marilyn (2001)
 Marilyn (Pictures of Diamonds) (2004)
 LeRoy Neiman: The President's Birthday (1962)
 Shelley Niro: The 500 Year Itch (1992)
 Claes Oldenburg: Ghost Wardrobe (for M.M.) (1967)
 Eduardo Paolozzi:
 Bash (1971)
 Dear Marilyn Monroe
 Ed Paschke: Pink Lady 2 (1993)
 Pier Paolo Pasolini: La Rabbia (1963)
 Guy Peellaert: Marilyn Monroe (1994–1999)
 Raymond Pettibon: No Title (1990–2003)
 Paul Pfeiffer: Four Horsemen of the Apocalypse: 1 (2000)
 Peter Phillips: For Men Only, Starring MM and BB (1961)
 Arnulf Rainer: Mythos Marilyn series (2002)
 Mel Ramos: Peek-a-Boo series (2002)
 Robert Rauschenberg: Test Stone #1 (1967)
 Tom Richmond: Marilyn Monroe (1998)
 Faith Ringgold: Marilyn Monroe (1997)
 James Rosenquist: Marilyn Monroe I (1962) 
 Mimmo Rotella:
 Marilyn Monroe (1962)
 Marilyn Decollage (1964)
 I Vilti (1998)
 Marilyn II (1979)
 La Magnifica Preda (2004)
 Paolo Schmidlin: At Rest (2012) 
 George Segal: The Film Poster (1967)
 Richard Serra: Marilyn Monroe-Greta Garbo (1981)
 Cindy Sherman: Untitled (1986)
 Roger Shimomura: Heroine, Hammer, Hibachi (1987)
 Hajime Sorayama: Sexy Robot in Yellow (album cover of Aerosmith's Just Push Play)
 Daniel Spoerri:
 The Spirit of Marilyn Captured by Merlin (2003)
 Merlin Meets Marilyn (2003)
 Der Teddybar von MM (2003)
 John Stango: Marilyn Monroe (2010)
 Brett-Livingstone Strong: Tribute to Marilyn Monroe (1989)
 Harold Town: Superstar (1970)
 Jacques Villeglé: Marilyn (1982)
 Wolf Vostell: Marilyn Monroe (1962)
 Erik Wahl: Untitled (2012) (bought by Pink)
 Kerry Waghorn: Marilyn Monroe
 Petrus Wandrey: Memento-Marilyn-Monroe (2003)
 Andy Warhol:
 Marilyn Diptych (1962)
 Gold Marilyn Monroe (1962)
 Twenty-five Colored Marilyns (1962)
 Shot Marilyns (1964)
 Untitled from Marilyn Monroe (1967)
 Tom Wesselmann: Marilyn in Bed (1984)
 Stephen B. Whatley: 40th Anniversary Tribute (2002)
 Jon Whitcomb:
 Untitled (1958) (owned by Joe DiMaggio)
 Cover and illustrations for the March 1959 Cosmopolitan
 Susan Dorothea White: The Crowning with Sexism (1994)
 Willard Wigan: Marilyn Monroe on a Diamond (2007–2008)
 Erwin Wurm: Thinking About Marilyn (2003)
 Jean-Pierre Yvaral: Marilyn Monroe series (1990–1994)
 Zevs: Visual Violation – Marilyn Monroe (2011)

See also: Marilyn in Art Roger Taylor (Ed.), Chaucer Press (2006), 

See also: Elvis + Marilyn: 2x Immortal Geri DePaoli (Ed.), Rizzoli (1994),

Celebrities as Monroe
 Amy Lee: dressed as Monroe (according to her she's called "Scarilyn Monroe") from The Seven Year Itch for the Halloween Party in 2007
 Anna Nicole Smith: aspired to be her favorite blonde Marilyn Monroe
 Christina Aguilera: for the June 2006 GQ
 Courtney Stodden: dressed as Monroe from The Seven Year Itch wearing clear platform heels in 2012.
 Drew Barrymore: for the September 1996 George
 Em Ford: Dressed as Monroe for the iconic women in history for YouTube.
 Barbara Walters: as Monroe from Gentlemen Prefer Blondes from a Halloween episode of The View in 2003.
 Beyoncé: for the May 2014 Out
 Lara Bingle: for the August 2008 Australian Cosmopolitan
 Gina St. John: dresses as Monroe from The Seven Year Itch in a CNet Central Halloween-themed episode from 1995.
 Hillary Clinton: retouched photo aping the "subway grate" pose from The Seven Year Itch on the October 1995 Spy
 Hugh Hefner: wants to be buried next to Monroe's gravestone when he dies. Hefner passed away in 2017.
 Mariah Carey: paid homage to Marylin's 1953 visit to U.S. troops in Korea in her "I Still Believe" music video.
 Cindy Crawford, Daryl Hannah, Ashley Judd, and Heather Locklear: for the May/June 1997 American Photo
 Miley Cyrus: for the March 2014 German Vogue
 James Franco: at the 83rd Academy Awards
 Dawn French and Jennifer Saunders: aped "Two Little Girls from Little Rock" from Gentlemen Prefer Blondes
 Jade Goody: as Marilyn Diptych for The Daily Star
 Rachel Hunter: dressed as Monroe in an episode of the British reality competition series Celebrity Stars in Their Eyes in 2000.
 Rudolph Giuliani: for the 1997 New York Inner Circle press dinner
 Sharon Osbourne: dressed as Monroe as she is lip synching to Diamonds Are a Girl's Best Friend during their 2nd Annual Rocktober Lip Sync War on an episode of The Talk in 2016.
 Paris Hilton: for the August 2010 launch of her perfume, Tease
 Nicole Kidman: for the March 2008 Harper's Bazaar Australia
 Lindsay Lohan: recreated The Last Sitting with photographer Bert Stern for the February 25, 2008 New York
 for the July 2009 Vogue España
 for the January/February 2012 Playboy
 Jennifer Lopez: paid homage to "Happy Birthday, Mr. President" on the April 22, 2010 Lopez Tonight
 Madonna: for the April 1991 Vanity Fair shot by Steven Meisel
 Katie Couric: Dressed as Monroe from Gentlemen Prefer Blondes for The Today Show Halloween episode in 2005.
 Kim Kardashian: Wears Monroe's iconic dress at the 2022 gala
 Kylie Minogue: regularly performs as Monroe
 Andreja Pejić: "Marilyn Off Duty" shoot for the October 2011 Lovecat Magazine
 Lisa Marie Presley: for Herb Ritts and made-up by Kevyn Aucoin
 Britney Spears: performed "If U Seek Amy" as Monroe on her Femme Fatale Tour
 The Seven Year Itch "subway grate" pose has been aped by numerous celebrities, including Annalise Braakensiek, Melissa George, Geri Halliwell, Anna Kournikova, Tiffany Pollard, Samantha Riley, and Anna Nicole Smith
 June Shannon (a.k.a. Mama June) dressed as Monroe in The Seven Year Itch to promote Mama June:From Not to Hot.
 Julia Louis-Dreyfus: for The New Adventures of Old Christine.
 Sungmin: in Super Show 4
 Eunhyuk dressed as Monroe from The Seven Year Itch at the Incheon International Airport
 Xuxa Meneghel dressed as Monroe in an episode of Dancing Brasil (the Brazilian version of Dancing with the Stars) in 2017.
Zia Dantes (daughter of Dingdong & Marian Dantes) dressed as Monroe from The Seven Year Itch for a photoshoot in Hawaii.

Editorial cartoons
 Don Wright: Earth weeps as Monroe's star streaks across the heavens (The Miami News, August 6, 1962)
 Michael Ramirez of Investor's Business Daily:
 Ali Khamenei apes the "subway grate" pose from The Seven Year Itch (June 23, 2009)
 Monroe as the national debt croons "Happy Birthday, Mr. President" (August 5, 2009)
 John Roberts apes the "subway grate" pose from The Seven Year Itch (June 25, 2015)
  Nate Beeler of The Columbus Dispatch:
 Chris Christie apes the "subway grate" pose from The Seven Year Itch (September 28, 2011)

Fashion
 Dolce & Gabbana: Fall-Winter 2009-2010 collection
 Betsey Johnson: "Mary-Lynn" tote bag line
 MAC Cosmetics: Marilyn Monroe Collection
 Macy's: Marilyn Monroe Collection
 Monroe piercings
 Nike: Warhol/Monroe Air Max 90 (2009)
 Marilyn Monroe's pink dress
 6126 by Lindsay Lohan: named after Monroe's birthdate
 Warnaco Group: Warner's Marilyn Monroe intimate apparel line (1996)
 White dress of Marilyn Monroe
 Zales: Marilyn Monroe Jewelry Collection 

See also: Marilyn in Fashion: The Enduring Influence of Marilyn Monroe by Christopher Nickens and George Zeno, Running Press (2012),

Film

 The Apartment: Dobisch tells Baxter he's trying to pick up a girl who looks like Monroe; the girl apes Monroe
 Asso: Silvia's dress blown up à la Monroe from The Seven Year Itch
 Babylon: Manny walks past a pin-up shop selling posters of Monroe. 
 Back to the Future Part II: Monroe is one of the women Biff dated 
 Birds of Prey: Harley Quinn played by Margot Robbie parodies "Diamonds Are a Girl's Best Friend" from Gentlemen Prefer Blondes 
 Blades of Glory: Fairchild skates as Monroe from The Seven Year Itch
 Blonde Ambition: Katie apes the "subway grate" pose from The Seven Year Itch
 Blonde: Fictional take on Monroe's life portrayed by Ana de Armas
 Bordello of Blood: Lilith apes the "subway grate" pose from The Seven Year Itch
 Broken Embraces: Lena apes Monroe
 Burlesque: Ali Rose sings Diamond's Are a Girl's Best Friend as Nikki and Georgia lip-sync the Monroe version
 Calendar Girl: Three young men go to Hollywood to fulfill their dream of meeting Monroe
 Capote: Capote tells a reporter about a visit he paid to Monroe
 Confessions of a Teenage Drama Queen: Lola is dressed as Monroe from The Seven Year Itch
 Cool World: Holli sings the title song of Let's Make Love
 Date Movie: Julia apes Monroe from The Seven Year Itch
 Death Becomes Her: Monroe from Gentlemen Prefer Blondes attends Helen's party 
 Deck the Halls: the Finch's Christmas tree angel apes the "subway grate" pose from The Seven Year Itch
 Don't Tell Mom the Babysitter's Dead: Mrs. Sturak's car is stolen by three drag performers, one of whom is dressed as Monroe from The Seven Year Itch 
 El Tinte de La Fama: Magaly enters a television contest that is looking for a Monroe look-a-like in order to win a 25.000 dólares (i.e. $25,000) cash prize. Magaly teams up with Héctor whom she believes to be Monroe's reincarnation as a "third world transsexual man".
 Fade to Black: Binford is obsessed with Monroe
 Finding Graceland: Byron and Elvis meet a Monroe look-a-like
 Flashback (1990): An early 50 second CGI film which recreates the classic subway grate scene from The Seven Year Itch
 Goodbye, Norma Jean: Based on Monroe
 Goodnight, Sweet Marilyn: Follow up to Goodbye, Norma Jean
 The Goddess: Emily Ann/Rita Shawn is based on Monroe
 Grease 2: Paulette is obsessed with Monroe and John F. Kennedy's alleged affair
 Hercules (1997): a Muse apes the "subway grate" pose from The Seven Year Itch
 The House Bunny: Shelly apes Monroe from The Seven Year Itch
 I Heart Huckabees: Dawn apes "Happy Birthday, Mr. President" in a Huckabees ad
 I Love a Man in Uniform: A female bank robber is dressed as Monroe from The Seven Year Itch
 Insignificance: The Actress is based on Monroe
 Kingpin: Claudia apes the "subway grate" pose from The Seven Year Itch
 L.A. Confidential: a call girl has been "cut" to look like Monroe
 L.A. Slasher: The Teen Mom is murdered by The Slasher while she is dressed as Monroe from The Seven Year Itch 
 The Ladies Man: a girl Hebert delivers mail to apes Monroe
 La La Land: The Traffic Conductor's dress blows up à la Monroe's "subway grate" pose from The Seven Year Itch 
 The Legend of Marilyn Monroe: documentary about Monroe
 Léon: The Professional: Mathilda dresses up as Monroe and sings "Happy Birthday, Mr. President" 
 A Life Less Ordinary: Lewis works on a novel about Monroe and Robert F. Kennedy's love child
 Little Voice: LV mimics Monroe's voice
 Looney Tunes: Back in Action: Bugs Bunny dresses as Monroe
 Magic Mike: Mike dresses as Monroe from The Seven Year Itch
 Man on Fire: Rayburn owns a statue of Monroe aping the "subway grate" pose from The Seven Year Itch
 Marilyn: documentary hosted by Rock Hudson
 Marilyn's Man: documentary about Monroe's first husband James Dougherty
 Me and Marilyn: Marchesi is advised by Monroe's ghost
 Mini's First Time: Mini unwittingly apes the "subway grate" pose from The Seven Year Itch
 The Misfits: Roslyn tries to keep Guido from looking at photos of Monroe that Gay has taped inside a closet
 Mister Lonely: Samantha Morton's character claims to be Monroe
 Monkeybone: Monkeybone impersonates Monroe
 Monster: Aileen recalls her childhood dream of being the next Monroe
 Moulin Rouge!: Satine sings Diamond's Are a Girl's Best Friend 
 My Week with Marilyn: While making The Prince and the Showgirl, Monroe strikes up a friendship with Colin Clark
 Nobody Else but You: A man investigates the death of a woman who though she was the reincarnation of Monroe 
 Planet 51: An alien girl tries to hold down her white dress as a vent blows it up à la The Seven Year Itch
 Pulp Fiction: a waitress is dressed as Monroe from The Seven Year Itch
 Rendez-vous in Montreal: a virtual Monroe stars with Humphrey Bogart
 Room to Rent: Linda is a Marilyn Monroe impersonator 
 Same Time, Next Year: A photo of Monroe's "subway grate" pose from The Seven Year Itch is part of a montage
 The Seven Year Itch: Sherman sarcastically tell MacKenzie that the blonde in the kitchen is Monroe 
 The Shawshank Redemption: One of Dufresne's posters is of Monroe's "subway grate" pose from The Seven Year Itch.
 Showgirls 2: Penny's From Heaven: A Monroe impersonator wearing a pink wig can be seen
 Shrek 2: The Fairy Godmother makes Fiona ape the "subway grate" pose from The Seven Year Itch
 The Smurfs (2011): Smurfette apes the "subway grate" pose from The Seven Year Itch
 Spice World: Ginger Spice poses as Monroe from The Seven Year Itch 
 Stroker Ace: a pit crew member makes Pembrook ape the "subway grate" pose from The Seven Year Itch
 Teaching Mrs. Tingle: Jo Lynn gives her class presentation as Monroe from The Seven Year Itch
 The Tigger Movie: Tigger dresses as Monroe from The Seven Year Itch
 Tommy: The Preacher leads a cult based on Monroe
 Town & Country: Auburn dresses as Monroe from Gentlemen Prefer Blondes
 Tropico: Monroe appears in the Garden of Eden with Adam, Eve, Jesus, the Virgin Mary, John Wayne and Elvis Presley
 The Underground Comedy Movie: Peeping Tom uses a fan to blow up the skirt of a Monroe look-a-like 
 Wayne's World: Wayne impersonates Monroe singing "Happy Birthday, Mr. President" 
 White Palace: Nora is a Monroe fan
 The Woman in Red: Charlotte unwittingly apes the "subway grate" pose from The Seven Year Itch
 Wonder Boys: James steals the jacket Monroe wore the day she married Joe DiMaggio from Gaskell, who is obsessed with the DiMaggio-Monroe marriage
 Wrongfully Accused: Harrison's kilt blows up à la the "subway grate" pose from The Seven Year Itch
 Younger and Younger: Younger has a vision of a girl aping Monroe from The Seven Year Itch
 Zapped!: Barney makes a girl at the prom ape the "subway grate" pose from The Seven Year Itch

Graphic novels
 Superman: Red Son by Mark Millar (2003) Features an older version of Marilyn Monroe.
 Deadpool by Gerry Duggan and Brian Posehn (2013) Deadpool disguises himself as Marilyn Monroe, to kill a reanimated John F. Kennedy.
  Eterna Marilyn by Fran Sabariego (2019).

Literature
 Alvah Bessie: The Symbol (1966), based on Monroe's life
 Truman Capote: "A Beautiful Child" from Music for Chameleons (1980)
 Mort Castle: I Am Your Need (2001)
 Douglas Coupland: Polaroids from the Dead (1996)
 Peter Golenbock: 7: The Mickey Mantle Novel (2007), Monroe and Mickey Mantle have an affair
 Edward Gorman: The Marilyn Tapes (1995)
 Doris Grumbach: "The Missing Person" (1981)
 Allan Gurganus: Blessed Assurance (1990)
 Michael Korda: The Immortals (1992)
 Paul Levinson: "Marilyn and Monet" (2017)
 Carole Morin: Dead Glamorous: the Autobiography of Seduction and Self Destruction (1996), a poetic account of the fascination of charismatic suicides including Marilyn, Ian Curtis, and Sylvia Plath
 Graham Masterton: Ikon (1982)
 Norman Mailer: Marilyn: A Biography, Of Women and Their Elegance (1980)
 Joyce Carol Oates: Blonde, and "Three Girls" (1996)
 Andrew O'Hagan: The Life and Opinions of Maf the Dog, and of His Friend Marilyn Monroe (2010)
 John Rechy: Marilyn's Daughter (1989)
 Lee Siegel: Who Wrote the Book of Love? (2005)
 Anne Carson: Norma Jeane Baker of Troy (2019)

See also: Mondo Marilyn: An Anthology of Fiction and Poetry Richard Peabody and Lucinda Ebersole (Eds), St. Martin's Press (1995), 

See also: Marilyn: Shades of Blonde Carole Nelson Douglas (ed.), Tor Books (1997),

Music
 Tori Amos: "Father Lucifer" references Monroe and Joe DiMaggio
 Ray Anthony: "My Marilyn"
 The Beatles: Monroe is on the cover of Sgt. Pepper's Lonely Hearts Club Band
 New Order: "1963" references the assassination of John F. Kennedy so that "he could do one with Monroe".
 Dan Bern: "Marilyn"
 Beyoncé: "Sexy Lil' Thug" references Monroe
 Blondie: "Platinum Blonde" references Monroe
 Blue System:
 "The Wind Cries (Who Killed Norma Jean)"
 "Good Night Marilyn"
 Bon Jovi: "Captain Crash & the Beauty Queen From Mars" references Monroe and Joe DiMaggio
 David Bowie: "Jean Genie" references Monroe
 Citizen Cope: "Healing Hands" references Monroe
 City Boy: "Summer in the School Yard" references Monroe
 Sheryl Crow: "If It Makes You Happy" references Monroe
 Culture Club: "It's a Miracle" references Monroe
 CupcakKe: "Best Dick Sucker" references Monroe
 Def Leppard: "Photograph"
 Lana Del Rey:
 "Body Electric" references Monroe
 "Children of the Bad Revolution" references Monroe
 a demo of "Trash Magic" references Monroe
 Lady Gaga featuring R. Kelly: "Do What U Want" references Monroe and John F. Kennedy
 LSD "Audio" references Monroe
 The Distillers: "Gypsy Rose Lee" references Monroe
 Everlast: "Whitey's Revenge" references Monroe
 Bryan Ferry: "Goddess of Love" references Monroe
 Alexa Goddard: "Marilyn"
 Grinderman: "Palaces of Montezuma" references Monroe and John F. Kennedy
 Half Man Half Biscuit: "99% of Gargoyles Look Like Bob Todd" references Monroe
 Teppo Hauta-aho/Edward Vesala: 1973 album Ode to Marilyn
 Faith Hill: "The Secret of Life" references Monroe
 Michael Jackson: "Tabloid Junkie" references Monroe
 Jay-Z: "Hollywood" references Monroe
 "We Didn't Start the Fire" by Billy Joel
 Elton John:
 "Candle in the Wind"
 "Wrap Her Up" (with George Michael) references Monroe
 "Lie to Me" by Mikolas Josef
 Tommy Keene: "My Mother Looked Like Marilyn Monroe"
 Alicia Keys: "Girl on Fire" reference Monroe
 The Kinks: "Celluloid Heroes" references Monroe
 Kinky Friedman: "Marilyn & Joe"
 Kool Keith: "Livin' Astro" references Monroe
 Lady Gaga:
 "Dance in the Dark" references Monroe
 "Do What U Want" featuring R. Kelly references Monroe's alleged affair with John F. Kennedy
 "Nothing On (But The Radio)" references Monroe
 "Government Hooker" is about Monroe's alleged affair with John F. Kennedy 
 Laze & Royal: "Marilyn Monroe"
 Phoebe Legere: "Marilyn Monroe"
 Valery Leontiev: "Marilyn"
 Amanda Lepore': "Marilyn"
 Lil Xan featuring Charli XCX: "Moonlight" references Monroe
 Jennifer Lopez featuring Nas: "I'm Gonna be Alright" references Monroe and Joe DiMaggio
 Madonna: "Vogue" references Monroe
 Man From Delmonte: "Beautiful People" references Monroe and Joe DiMaggio
 Marilyn Manson and his band is taken from Monroe and Charles Manson
 Marina and the Diamonds: "State Of Dreaming" references Monroe
 Ava Max: "Salt" references Monroe
 Melanie Martinez (singer): "You Love I" loops a quote Monroe gives in a 1960 interview backwards 
 Jessica Mauboy featuring Snoop Dogg: "Get 'Em Girls" references Monroe
 Jhony Kaze: "Marilyn Monroe"
 Metallica: "The Memory Remains" quotes a line from Monroe's character in The Misfits
 Minako Honda: "Nen No Marilyn"
 Nicki Minaj: "Marilyn Monroe"
 K Camp: "Marilyn Monroe"
 Kylie Minogue: "Mr. President" references Monroe
 Misfits:
 "Who Killed Marilyn?"
 The band takes its name from The Misfits
 Maren Morris: "Rich" referenced Monroe
 Norma Jean: takes its name from Monroe's real name, Norma Jeane
 Pauline Oliveros: "To Valerie Solanas and Marilyn Monroe in Recognition of Their Desperation" 
 Roland Orzabal: "Dandelion" references Monroe
 A Perfect Circle: "So Long, and Thanks for All the Fish" references Monroe
 Brianna Perry: "Marilyn Monroe"
 Katy Perry: "Hey Hey Hey" references Monroe
 Perez Prado: "Marilyn Monroe Mambo"
 Los Prisioneros: "¿Quién mató a Marilyn?"
 Brian Protheroe: "Pinball" references Monroe
 Red Hot Chili Peppers: "Wet Sand" references her as Norma Jeane
 Rihanna: "Love Without Tragedy / Mother Mary" references Monroe
 Robbie Robertson: "American Roulette" references Monroe
 Kelly Rowland: "Stole" references Monroe
 Pete Seeger: "Who Killed Norma Jean?", debuted at his June 8, 1963 Carnegie Hall concert
 Brian Setzer Orchestra: "Americano" references Monroe
 Sevdaliza: "Marilyn Monroe"
 Sleeper: "Romeo Me" references Monroe and Joe DiMaggio
 Spice Girls: "The Lady is a Vamp" references Monroe
 Stereophonics: "She Takes Her Clothes Off" references Monroe
 Suede: "Heroine" references Monroe
 Tiffany: "Kiss the Ground" references Monroe
 Jordy Towers: "Don't Say It's Over" references Monroe
 Keith Urban: "John Cougar, John Deere, John 3:16" references Monroe
 Tom Waits:
 "Jitterbug Boy" references Monroe
 "A Sweet Little Bullet From a Pretty Blue Gun" references Monroe
 "Hold On" references Monroe
 "Marilyn Monroe" by Pharrell Williams
 "Marilyn Monroe" by Danielle Cohn
 "Marilyn Monroe" by Sevdaliza
 Robbie Williams: "The Actor" references Monroe
 Bat For Lashes: "Marilyn" references Monroe
 (G)I-dle: 
 I Love concept references Monroe
 "Nxde" references Monroe

Music videos

 "Love Action" by The Human League (1981): The music video features archival footage of Monroe and Arthur Miller
 "Girls Just Want to Have Fun" by Cyndi Lauper (1983): A girl has a poster of Monroe on her wall
 "Photograph" by Def Leppard (1983): An actress is glammed up as Monroe from The Seven Year Itch
 "Fresh" by Kool & the Gang (1984): The Fairy Godmother is glammed up as Monroe
 "In Neon" by Elton John (1984): The music video features Monroe's Hollywood Walk of Fame star
 "Material Girl" by Madonna (1985): The music video is a mimicry of Monroe's performance of the song "Diamonds Are a Girl's Best Friend" from the 1953 film Gentlemen Prefer Blondes. "Well, my favorite scene in all of Monroe's movies is when she does that dance sequence for 'Diamonds Are a Girl's Best Friend'. And when it came time to do the video for the song [Material Girl], I said, I can just redo that whole scene and it will be perfect," she explained in a 1987 interview with New York Daily News. "Marilyn was made into something not human in a way, and I can relate to that. Her sexuality was something everyone was obsessed with and that I can relate to. And there were certain things about her vulnerability that I'm curious about and attracted to."
 "Sex as a Weapon" by Pat Benatar (1985): The music video features archival footage of Monroe
 "Dancing on the Ceiling" by Lionel Richie (1986): In the video, there is a reference to the film The Seven Year Itch when air blows a woman's skirt over her head
 "If You Were a Woman (And I Was a Man)" by Bonnie Tyler (1986): The music video features a Rambo-like male soldier swinging on a rope as he lands on the stage while Tyler and the people on stage start to hold up a circle-and-cross female symbol who then transforms via An American Werewolf in London-style special effects into a sultry Marilyn Monroe-like female vixen
 "Don't Drop Bombs" by Liza Minnelli (1989): A poster of Gentlemen Prefer Blondes can be seen on a wall of the room in the beginning of the video.
 "Rock Me Gently" by Erasure (1996): Monroe (played by famous drag impersonator Jimmy James) appears in the video.
 "I Still Believe" covered by Mariah Carey (1999): The music video recreates Monroe's 1954 performance for troops in Korea
 "Don't Forget About Us" by Mariah Carey (2005): During a pool scene, Carey re-enacts a part from Monroe's film Something's Got to Give (1962) by singing with one leg up on the edge. In an interview with MTV News, Carey spoke of the re-enactment: "That shot was totally and completely inspired by 'Something's Got to Give,' Marilyn Monroe's last movie that never got finished. It's an homage to her, because I've never seen anyone re-create it. So many people have emulated so many of Marilyn's classic moments, but it's just that I'm a big fan of hers, and I thought it was really pretty at night with the pool. No one could ever be as fabulous as Marilyn was, but it's in honor and homage to her."
 "2 Hearts" Kylie Minogue (2007): Minogue dresses as Monroe from Some Like It Hot.
 "Give Me All Your Luvin'" by Madonna featuring Nicki Minaj and M.I.A. (2012): Costumes worn in the video included a retro inspired look; the trio wore white lace dresses reminiscent of Madonna's look in her 20s, as well as Marilyn Monroe.
 "National Anthem" by Lana Del Rey (2012): Del Rey apes Monroe's "Happy Birthday, Mr. President"
 "Applause" by Lady Gaga (2013): Gaga dresses like Monroe in The Seven Year Itch.
 "Below" by White Lung (2016): A group of Marilyn Monroe look-a-likes can be seen at a movie theater.
 "Marilyn Monroe" by Danielle "Dani" Cohn (2017): The main theme of the video is about Monroe.
 "Coltrane" by Anja Kotar (2017): Kotar channels Monroe in the video.
 "What Is Love?" by Twice (2018): Chaeyoung dresses like Marilyn from The Seven Year Itch.
 "Paradise" by Ofenbach featuring Benjamin Ingrosso (2018): Dorian Lo and César de Rummel act as judges at a talent show, in which an old Marilyn Monroe wannabe is one of the participants performing.
 "After Like" by IVE (2022): Yujin dresses like Monroe in "Diamonds Are A Girls Best Friend" and recreated the part where she's surrounded by hearts on the stairs in the pink dress.
 "Nxde" by (G)I-dle (2022): Each member of the group reference Monroe from various media surrounding her, and at the end of the music video appears a message mentioning Monroe.

Online
Epic Rap Battles of History Monroe appears in a rap battle with Cleopatra.

Opera
 Marilyn (1980) by Lorenzo Ferrero
 Marilyn (1993) by Ezra Laderman and Norman Rosten for the New York City Opera
 Marilyn Forever (2010) by Marilyn Bowering and Gavin Bryars

Photography
 Slim Aarons, Richard Avedon, Eve Arnold, Baron, Luiz Carlos Barreto, George Barris, Peter Basch, Cecil Beaton, Antony Beauchamp, Otto Bettmann, Carlyle Blackwell, Jr., Cornell Capa, Jack Cardiff, Jock Carroll, Henri Cartier-Bresson, Larry Burrows, Ed Clark, William Claxton, Howell Conant, David Conover, Henri Dauman, Bruce Davidson, Loomis Dean, Nick De Morgoli, Alfred Eisenstaedt, John Engstead, Elliott Erwitt, J. R. Eyerman, Ed Feingersh, John Florea, Robert Frank, Burt Glinn, Allan Grant, Milton H. Greene, Ernst Haas, Philippe Halsman, Erich Hartmann, Bob Henriques, Jean Howard, Frank Hurley, George Hurrell, Joseph Jasgur, Tom Kelley, Douglas Kirkland, Herman Leonard, Harold Lloyd, Lee Lockwood, Jacques Lowe, Arthur Marx, Gjon Mili, Richard C. Miller, Earl Moran, Inge Morath, Nickolas Muray, William B. Murphy, Arnold Newman, Don Ornitz, Gordon Parks, Willy Rizzo, Herb Scharfman, Lawrence Schiller, Paul Schutzer, George Silk, Peter Stackpole, Len Steckler, Bert Stern, Phil Stern, Dennis Stock, Cecil W. Stoughton, Bob Thomas, Gene Trindl, John Vachon, Delmar Watson, Weegee, Dan Weiner, Leigh Wiener, Laszlo Willinger, Bob Willoughby, Garry Winogrand, William Woodfield, Frank Worth, and Jerome Zerbe were among the photographers who shot Monroe 
 The American Masters documentary "Marilyn Monroe: Still Life" claims that she was the most photographed person in history
 American Photo May/June 1997 issue was devoted to Monroe

See also: Marilyn Monroe by Eve Arnold, Harry N. Abrams (2005), 

See also: Marilyn Monroe and the Camera by Georges Belmont, Te Neues Publishing (2000), 

See also: Marilyn by André de Dienes Steve Crist (Ed.), Taschen (2002), 

See also: LIFE: Remembering Marilyn (2009), 

See also: The Last Sitting by Bert Stern

See also: Marilyn: Norma Jean by Gloria Steinem with George Barris

Poetry
 Sherman Alexie: "Tourists" poem series (1997)
 Steven Berkoff: "You Remind Me of Marilyn Monroe" (2009)
 Frank Bidart: "Marilyn Monroe" (2006)
 Marilyn Bowering: "Anyone Can See I Love You" (1987)
 Ernesto Cardenal: "Marilyn Monroe" (1975)
 Victor di Suvero: "Marilyn, My Marilyn" (2003)
 Judy Grahn: "I Have Come to Claim Marilyn Monroe's Body" (1971)
 Lyn Lifshin: "Marilyn Monroe" (1994)
 Edwin Morgan: "The Death of Marilyn Monroe" (1962) (published in New Statesman)
 Sharon Olds: "The Death of Marilyn Monroe" (1984)
 Norman Rosten: "Who Killed Norma Jeane?" (1963)
 Delmore Schwartz: "Love and Marilyn Monroe"
 John Whitworth: "Making Love to Marilyn Monroe" (1990)

Radio
 The Charlie McCarthy Show: "November 9, 1952", Charlie McCarthy and Monroe announce their engagement
 Marilyn and Ella Backstage at the Mocambo: a 2005 BBC Radio 4 drama which recounts how Monroe helped Fitzgerald book a gig at the jazz club
 Old Harry's Game: "Olympics Special 2012, Episode One", Thomas is crushed under an unconscious hippopotamus at Satan's Infernal Olympics; Scumspawn uses Monroe as an incentive for Thomas to extract himself from the hippo.

Television
 American Gods: "Lemon Scented You", during Mr. World's pitch to Wednesday, Media assumes the form of Monroe from The Seven Year Itch
 Angelina Ballerina: The Next Steps: "Angelina's Gift for Ms. Mimi", a gust of wind makes Angelina ape the "subway grate" pose from The Seven Year Itch
 Animaniacs (1993): "Method to Her Madness", Slappy and Skippy attend a method acting class Monroe is in
 Archer: "Edie's Wedding", Pam's attire and hairstyle for Edie's wedding makes her resemble Monroe
 Arrested Development:
 "What Goes Around": Lucille Bluth sings "Happy Birthday Mr. President" to George Bluth in order to simulate him
 "A New Start": Tobias Fünke settles on The Seven Year Itch/Marilyn Monroe style of bed sheets
 The Beverly Hillbillies: "The Clampetts Go Hollywood", Elly May glams up as Monroe
 Bewitched: "The Catnapper", Endora tells Samantha that her "mortal roommate seems to be getting "the seven-year-itch" five years early when he begins working nights"
 Blonde: a partially fictionalized account of Monroe's life
 Brides of Beverly Hills: "Zahava Marks", A Marilyn Monroe impersonator finds a wedding dress fit for an old Hollywood sex symbol
 Brooklyn Nine-Nine: "The Therapist", Charles Boyle says that "The painting in the bathroom of Jesus standing over a vent with his robe blowing up like Marilyn Monroe?"
 Cagney & Lacey: "Jane Doe #37", a girl Cagney and Lacey arrest gives her name as "Norma Jeane Baker", the name Monroe was known as growing up
 The Celebrity Look-Alike Show: In this special from 2003, a female audience member is dressed like Monroe.
 The Chase: 
 (Christmas Special) Anne Hegerty (a.k.a. "The Governess") dresses as Monroe from The Seven Year Itch.
 (Impersonators): Monroe look-a-like Suzie Kennedy is a contestant on an episode.
 Children in Need "2007": Wendi Peters performed a version of Diamonds Are a Girl's Best Friend from Gentlemen Prefer Blondes by adding "I Am a Material Girl" halfway through, then returning to the normal song.
 Clone High: Monroe hangs out at The Grassy Knoll with Nostradamus
 Combination Lock: In the pilot, it briefly mentions about "Marilyn Monroe's Appointment Book" where it was purchased at the website Goldenpalace.com where the contestant couples would match the item with its purchase price in thousands of dollars (SPOILER ALERT: The answer to that question, in particular, was in fact "11" as it was sold online for $11,000).
 Crazy Ex-Girlfriend:
 "All Signs Point To Josh...or Is It Josh's Friend?", Rebecca Bunch in a blue dress and gloves sings in the music video "The Math of Love Triangle" is a paid homage to Monroe's Diamond's Are a Girl's Best Friend from Gentlemen Prefer Blondes
 "I Need to Find My Frenemy", "The Math of Love Quadrangles" is a reprise version of "The Math of Love Triangles" which itself is a parody of Diamonds Are a Girl's Best Friend from Gentlemen Prefer Blondes
 Criminal Minds: "Reflections of Desire", Garcia quotes Monroe
 The Critic:
 "Marathon Mensch", Jay imagines himself as a Monroe impersonator aping the "subway grate" pose from The Seven Year Itch
 "LA Jay", a transvestite in a white dress offers to stand over a grate like Monroe in The Seven Year Itch
 Designing Women: "Hard Hats and Lovers", Charlene  dresses as Monroe from The Seven Year Itch at a country club masquerade ball
 Desperate Housewives: "Excited and Scared", Renée dresses as Monroe from The Seven Year Itch for Halloween; Lee also dresses as Monroe from The Seven Year Itch as well
 Dexter's Laboratory: "Blonde Leading the Blonde", Dexter apes the "subway grate" pose from The Seven Year Itch
 Dice: "The Trial", After being cast as James Monroe in a musical, Dice announces to Carmen: "You are talking to President Marilyn Monroe"
 Doctor Who: "A Christmas Carol", The 11th Doctor (Matt Smith) becomes engaged to Monroe
 Drunk History: "Legends", Monroe and Ella Fitzgerald form a lasting friendship
 El gran juego de la oca: The Oquettes ape Monroe from The Seven Year Itch.
 Elvis: Elvis tells his mother she is more beautiful than Monroe
 The Ernie Kovacs Show: Edie Adams regularly aped Monroe
 Family Guy: "Mom's the Word", Evelyn apes the "subway grate" pose from The Seven Year Itch
 Family Ties: "I Know Jennifer's Boyfriend", a poster of The Seven Year Itch is seen in the Keaton's house during Jennifer's 1950s-themed birthday party
 Farscape: "Revenging Angel", an animated version of Aeryn Sun briefly transforms into Marilyn Monroe from The Seven Year Itch
 Feud: Bette and Joan: "Pilot", Monroe (played by Alisha Soper) makes a guest appearance on the very first episode of the show as she accepts a Golden Globe award in 1960 for the classic romantic comedy film Some Like it Hot.
 Finding Marilyn: An undeveloped reality series emulating Monroe's journey to stardom, twelve young actresses travel to Los Angeles by competing for the chance to become the next Hollywood "it" girl.
 48 Hours Mystery: "The Marilyn Tapes": Peter Van Sant reports on new documents and interviews about the night Marilyn Monroe died.
 Frasier: "Room Full of Heroes", Martin, as Joe DiMaggio, references Monroe; Daphne, as Elton John, references "Candle in the Wind"
 Full House: "Mad Money", Jesse brings home a Monroe impersonator
 Futurama:
 "I Dated a Robot", a teenager makes out with "Marilyn Monrobot"
 "Attack of the Killer App", Monroe's dress blowing up scene is spoofed
 "The Mutants Are Revolting", a girl's dress blows upward like Monroe in The Seven Year Itch
 Gilligan's Island: "The Producer", Ginger glams up as Monroe
 Gilmore Girls: "Red Light on the Wedding Night", a waiter at the club Lorelai has her bachelorette party is dressed as Monroe from The Seven Year Itch
 The Girls Next Door:
 "Mutiny on the Booty", Holly Madison is having a photoshoot that was inspired by Gentlemen Prefer Blondes and even later watches the film because of it
 "Family Affair", The late Hugh Hefner, Holly Madison and the dog are in bed watching a scene from Gentlemen Prefer Blondes
 Glee: "Girls (and Boys) on Film", Marley Rose and Wade "Unique" Adams with The New Directions Girls sings Diamond's are a Girl's Best Friend from Gentlemen Prefer Blondes along with a mashup of Material Girl by Madonna
 The Golden Girls: "Letters to Gorbachev", Blanche apes "Happy Birthday, Mr. President" to Mikhail Gorbachev
 Gossip Girl: "G.G.", Serena van der Woodsen dresses as Monroe from Gentlemen Prefer Blondes including Blair Waldorf dressing like Audrey Hepburn as Holly Golightly from Breakfast at Tiffany's in a dream sequence as part of the show's 100th episode
 Growing Pains: 
"Happy Halloween: Part 2", a character dresses as Monroe
"Carol's Carnival", Carol Seaver (Tracey Gold) dresses as Monroe from The Seven Year Itch as a vent from below blows her dress up like the famous scene
 Happy Endings: "Spooky Endings", Alex dresses as Monroe from The Seven Year Itch for a Halloween party
 Hart of Dixie: "Walkin' After Midnight", Lemon dresses as Monroe from The Seven Year Itch for a Halloween party
 Here Comes Honey Boo Boo: "A Very Boo Halloween", Mama June (a.k.a. June Shannon) dresses as Monroe from The Seven Year Itch in the episode from 2013
 Hey Arnold!: "The Beeper Queen", Helga Pataki's mother Miriam sings "Beepers Are a Girl's Best Friend" as a parody of "Diamond's Are a Girl's Best Friend"  from Gentlemen Prefer Blondes in a commercial for Big Bob's Beepers
 The Honeymooners: "A Woman's Work Is Never Done", Ralph references Monroe
 I Love Lucy: "Ricky's Movie Offer", Lucy and Ethel think Ricky's script has a Monroe-type part, and ask Fred which one of them looks like her; Lucy glams up as Monroe
 Inside the NBA: Monroe sings "Happy Birthday" to Charles Barkley who turned 55 years old
 Introducing Dorothy Dandridge: In one scene, Earl Mills discovers Dandridge under a piano along with two other rising stars Ava Gardner and Marilyn Monroe
 It's a Living: "Her Back to the Future", Dot dresses like Monroe from The Seven Year Itch during Nancy's dream
 It's Worth What?: A Marilyn Monroe impersonator wearing white gloves makes an appearance
 I've Got a Secret: "November 11, 1953", Gene Scanlon had a date with Marilyn Monroe (as she actually paid for the tab)
 The Jack Benny Program: "September 13, 1953", Monroe makes her first television appearance in the skit called "Honolulu Trip".
 Jessie: "Ghost Bummer", Jessie dresses as Monroe for Halloween
 Keeping Up with the Kardashians: "Paparazzi & Papas", Khloé asks her grandmother's prospective dates if they like Monroe
 The Kennedys: Monroe is obsessed with John F. Kennedy in the days leading up to her suicide but is warned against blackmailing him.
 Last Man Standing: "Adrenaline", Mike references Monroe on his Webcast
 Law & Order: Criminal Intent: "Bombshell", a prescription bottle found by Logan and Wheeler is made out to Monroe's birth name, Norma Mortensen; Merritt references Monroe
 DC's Legends of Tomorrow:
 "Legends of To-Meow-Meow", Magical fugitive Charlie impersonates Monroe
 "Terms of Service", Magical fugitive Charlie impersonates Monroe
 Lethal Weapon (TV series): "Fools Rush In", A Monroe look a like personality is wearing the famous white dress from The Seven Year Itch
 Le Juste Prix (Belgium): Host Michaël Dufour dresses as Monroe from The Seven Year Itch.
 Let's Sing and Dance: Rosemary Shrager and Kim Woodburn performed Diamonds Are a Girl's Best Friend from Gentlemen Prefer Blondes in 2013
 Love, Marilyn
 Lucifer: "Lucifer, Stay. Good Devil", Monroe's white dress is seen.
 Mad Men:
 "Maidenform", Monroe and Jackie Kennedy inspire the agency's campaign for Playtex
 "Six Month Leave", Monroe's death affects Hollis, Joan, and the office girls
 Marilyn & Bobby: Her Final Affair
 The Marilyn Files: A two-hour live television special that aired on KTLA in 1992 hosted by Bill Bixby and Jane Wallace, where it reports that actress Marilyn Monroe was actually murdered when she died 30 years ago.
 Marilyn and Me
 Marilyn Monroe: The Final Days
 Marilyn, Misunderstood: A documentary (narrated by Kim Cattrall) tells the story of the other "Marilyn", a woman who didn't suddenly wake up and become the biggest star in the world.
 Marilyn: The Untold Story
 Married... with Children: "It's a Bundyful Life", Al asks his guardian angel if Monroe is laughing at him because he caved to Peg's demand that he toss his Playboys
 M*A*S*H: "Bombshells", Hawkeye and Charles start a rumor that Monroe is coming to the 4077 to thank the staff for caring for her cousin
 The Marvelous Mrs. Maisel: "Maisel vs. Lennon: The Cut Contest", a poster headline that says "Marilyn Weds Joe Dimaggio" can be seen on a wall at an office.
 Merrie Melodies: "Knight-mare Hare", as Bugs Bunny goes to another castle, he meets the residence of a warlock (or wizard) named Merlin of Monroe his name, in particular, is a pun on Marilyn Monroe
 Million Dollar Listing Los Angeles: "The One with the 7-Foot Marilyn", Swedish, New York real estate broker Fredrik Eklund goes all out on an iconic Marilyn Monroe costume (ala Gentlemen Prefer Blondes-style) for an open house party at his new $50 million Los Feliz property
 Modern Family: "Good Grief", Gloria Pritchett(Sofia Vergara) is dressed as Monroe from Gentlemen Prefer Blondes in a Halloween episode
 Movies Rock: Nicole Scherzinger performed a version of Diamonds Are a Girl's Best Friend from Gentlemen Prefer Blondes which paid tribute to the strong relationship between film and music
 Mr. Belvedere: "Mumsy", Kevin Owens has a movie poster of The Seven Year Itch hanging on the wall in his apartment
 Mr. Show with Bob and David: "If You're Going to Write a Comedy Scene, You're Going to Have Some Rat Feces in There", In the skit "Van Hammersly"(Bob Odenkirk), one of his billiard balls is named after Marilyn Monroe along with mentioning one of her most famous films The Seven Year Itch.
 The Muppets Go to the Movies: Miss Piggy performs the song "Heatwave" in a costume reminiscent of the one worn by Monroe in There's No Business like Show Business
 The Muppet Show:
 "Season 1, Episode 20", Valerie Harper donning a short blonde wig and brown dress briefly does an impression of Monroe during her opening number Broadway Baby
 "Season 4, Episode 23", Miss Piggy and Carol Channing sing Diamonds are a Girl's Best Friend from Gentlemen Prefer Blondes as the closing number
 Muppets Tonight: "Season 1, Episode 9", Miss Piggy and Whoopi Goldberg sing Diamonds are a Girl's Best Friend from Gentlemen Prefer Blondes as the closing number
 The Name's the Same:
 "September 3, 1952", a celebrity guest Johnny Mercer wants to be Marilyn Monroe
 "November 19, 1952", a contestant's actual name is Marilyn Monroe
 "January 12, 1954", two contestants' actual names are Marilyn Monroe and Joe DiMaggio
 "June 22, 1954", Van Johnson's "secret wish" is for Monroe to sit on his lap
 "August 31, 1954", Charles Coburn's "secret wish" is to dance the rumba with Monroe as he did in Gentlemen Prefer Blondes
 NCIS:
 "Kill Ari, Part 1", DiNozzo has Caitlin imitate the "subway grate" pose from The Seven Year Itch in his fantasy
 "Minimum Security", Ducky tells Abby his mother wears nothing to bed but Chanel No. 5 ever since Monroe said it's the only thing she wears to bed
 "Witch Hunt", Abby dresses as Monroe from The Seven Year Itch for Halloween
 The Next Best Thing: Who is the Greatest Celebrity Impersonator?: A celebrity impersonator named Jodi Fleisher impersonates Marilyn Monroe
 Norma Jean & Marilyn
 The Norm Show: "Norm vs. Fear", a girl dressed up like Monroe's character from The Seven Year Itch fixing a light as Taylor Clayton (Nikki Cox) shuts the door
 Nip/Tuck: "Joyce & Sharon Monroe", two Monroe Look-alikes want to look more like her
 One Tree Hill: "Pictures of You", Brooke Davis impersonates Monroe for a class assignment
 Parenthood (TV series): "Opening Night", Sydney Graham is dressed as Monroe from The Seven Year Itch
 The Pebbles and Bamm-Bamm Show: Cindy Curbstone is patterned after Monroe.
 Person to Person: Monroe gets interviewed by Edward R. Murrow in an episode that aired on April 8, 1955
 Phil Spector: Spector speculates on Monroe's death during his first meeting with Linda Kenney Baden
 Press Your Luck (Tormarken): Monroe's original nickname is mentioned as a question.
 The Pretender: "Curious Jarod", Jarod reviews a Simulation of the night of Monroe's death in which his younger self speculates as if "Norma Jean" or "Marilyn" was possibly murdered and why
 Pretty Little Liars: "This Is a Dark Ride", Hannah Marin dresses as Monroe from The Seven Year Itch in a Halloween episode
 The Price Is Right (1972): Former model (a.k.a. Barker's Beauty) Dian Parkinson dresses as Monroe during the showcase segment.
 Quantum Leap: "Good Bye Norma Jean" (Season 5) : Sam jumps into the body of Marilyn Monroe's chauffeur.
 Red Dwarf: "Meltdown": The crew find themselves on Wax-World, a theme park inhabited by wax-droids of famous real-life and fictional characters in human history, including Monroe (played by Pauline Bailey).
Reframed: Marilyn Monroe: A four-part documentary series that revisits the extraordinary story of a girl who sprang from nowhere to become the most famous woman in the world, narrated by Jessica Chastain.
 Saturday Night Live:
 Mary Gross as Monroe (Season 7, Episode 3)
 Teri Garr as Monroe (Season 9, Episode 5)
 Madonna as Monroe (Season 11, Episode 1)
 Charlize Theron as Monroe with Jimmy Fallon as Joe DiMaggio (Season 26, Episode 4)
 Abby Elliott as Monroe with Helen Mirren as Eleanor Roosevelt (Season 36, Episode 19)
 Nasim Pedrad as Monroe in an SNL Digital Short (Season 37, Episode 9)
 Chloe Fineman as Monroe in Blonde skit (Season 48, Episode 2)
 Scandalous: The Death of Marilyn Monroe
 Scrubs: "My Tormented Mentor", in one of the fantasy sequences; the male surgeons briefly dream that Dr. Grace Miller (Bellamy Young) is Monroe
 The Secret Life of Marilyn Monroe: a TV mini-series where it chronicles Monroe's family life, her relationship with her mother Gladys Pearl Baker and how she succeeded in hiding her most intimate secrets from the press and an invasive world.
 Semi-Homemade Cooking: Host/Chef Sandra Lee is dressed as Monroe fromGentlemen Prefer Blondes in a Halloween episode (Season 9, Episode 7)
 Seinfeld: "The Note", George references Monroe after Kramer claims he saw Joe DiMaggio at Dinky Donuts
 Sheep in the Big City: "Be Still My Bleating Heart", Sheep's wool briefly goes up in a Marilyn Monroe-like pose while standing over a subway vent
 She's Out (Episode 1): Connie Stephens (Zoe Heyes) sings a part of "Diamonds Are a Girl's Best Friend" from Gentlemen Prefer Blondes as she dances in the mirror to it. Stephens bears a resemblance to Monroe and also states that she was an inspiration to her.
 Since You've Been Gone: According to the intro of this special from 2000, it claims that an exclusive sprawling Palm Springs estate was once used by Monroe.
 Sing Your Face Off (Week 6): Former soap opera actress Lisa Rinna dressed as Monroe from Gentlemen Prefer Blondes in an episode
 The Simpsons:
 "The Homer They Fall", a picture of Monroe is on a jacket
 "Rosebud", Smithers imagines Mr. Burns singing "Happy Birthday to You" to him à la "Happy Birthday, Mr. President"
 a slide photo of Mr. Burns shows him aping the "subway grate" pose from The Seven Year Itch
 "Thirty Minutes over Tokyo" features a Monroe robot
 "Treehouse of Horror XIV", Professor Frink tells Bart and Lisa his father "worked on the atom bomb by day, slept with Marilyn Monroe by night, and sold secrets to the Russians at lunch"
 Moe apes the "subway grate" pose from The Seven Year Itch on Disk 4 of the Season 6 DVD set menu
 Dr. Marvin Monroe's original first name was Marilyn
 Smash: Main plot concerns the planning of a Broadway musical about Monroe
 Sordid Lives: The Series: "The Fall and Rise of Brother Boy", Ty is shown Monroe's ukulele from Some Like It Hot.
 Split Personality: Monroe was the subject in round 2.
 SpongeBob SquarePants: "My Leg!", Fred Rechid (a.k.a. Fred the Fish) briefly parodies the subway grate scene from The Seven Year Itch behind   a jewelry store along with saying "my leg!" in a sultry voice during a montage.
 The Starlet: Ten aspiring actresses live together in a house once owned by Monroe.
 Studio 10: a person dresses as Monroe from The Seven Year Itch in order to celebrate the show's 500th episode in 2015.
 30 Rock: "The One with the Cast of Night Court", Claire Harper (Jennifer Aniston) sings a sexy rendition of "Happy Birthday" to Jack Donaghy (Alec Baldwin) an illusion to Marilyn Monroe's performance to John F. Kennedy's birthday.
 Time Machine: a pic of Monroe on  the cover of a December 1953 issue of Playboy magazine along with a still of her from the classic film The Seven Year Itch can briefly be seen during the opening credits during the second season format of the show.
 Trivia Trap: A pic of Monroe can briefly be seen flying during the first season opening credits.
 T.J. Hooker: "Target: Hooker", a male drag performer impersonates Monroe.
 Tosh.0: "Boy in Black Face", a little girl dresses as Monroe in a spoof of The Seven Year Itch.
 To Tell the Truth:
 "April 7, 1967", Monroe's first husband James Dougherty appears as a "central character" in this episode.
 "November 1990", Monroe impersonator Jimmy James appears as a "central character" in this episode along with singing his version of "I want to be loved by you".
 Two and a Half Men: "Untainted by Filth", Charlie has a flashback of drunken Alan in a blonde wig singing "Happy Birthday, Mr. President" à la Monroe.
 Warehouse 13: "Love Sick", Monroe's hairbrush turns hair platinum blonde when used
 What's My Line?:
 "January 3, 1954", Art Gaisor sells Marilyn Monroe Calendars
 "September 12, 1954", Natasha Lytess (as Miss Tala Forman) is Marilyn Monroe's Drama Coach
 "September 18, 1955", Monroe's former husband Joe Dimaggio appears as a mystery guest
 "June 12, 1955", Tom Ewell appears as a mystery guest and promotes the film The Seven Year Itch
 "July 1, 1956", Judge Seymour Rabinowitz married both Marilyn Monroe and Arthur Miller
 "August 21, 1960", mystery guest Buddy Hackett signs in as "Marilyn Monroe" (however, it was written as "Maralyn Monroe")
 WKRP in Cincinnati: 
 "Commercial Break", Jennifer Marlowe (Loni Anderson) sings "Happy Birthday, Mr. President" to Herb Tarlek (Frank Bonner).
 "Filthy Pictures: Part 1", D. Arnold Gonzer (George Wyner) says "It's like those Marilyn Monroe pictures. Playboy built an empire on those".
 Your Face Sounds Familiar: some international versions features female stars dressing up as Monroe from Gentlemen Prefer Blondes.
 Zoey 101: "Haunted House", Zoey dresses as Monroe for Halloween

Theater

By Arthur Miller, Monroe's third husband:
 After the Fall (1964) – The play and its main characters, Maggie and Quentin, are based on Monroe and Miller and their marriage
 Finishing the Picture (2004) – The play is based on Miller's experiences of making The Misfits (1961), with Kay being based on Monroe

Plays and musicals based on Monroe's life or with Monroe as a central character:
 Marilyn (1975) by Adam Darius
 Insignificance (1982) by Terry Johnson: The Actress is based on Monroe
 Marilyn! the Musical (1983) by Jacques Wilson and Mort Garson
 Marilyn: An American Fable (1983)
 Strawhead (1986) by Norman Mailer and Richard Hannum
 Miss Golden Dreams (2001) by Joyce Carol Oates
 Marilyn Forever Blonde (2007)
 Marilyn and Ella (2008) by Bonnie Greer
 Marilyn's 2nd Chance (2009), and Marilyn Monroe, My Secret (2013) by Willard Manus
 Norma Jeane: The Musical (2013): songs written by Jay Aston
 The Only Light in Reno (2014) by Topher Payne
 Marilyn: My Secret with Erin Gavin as Monroe in the first run (2015)
Plays and musicals with Monroe as a minor character or referenced to:
 Will Success Spoil Rock Hunter? (1955): Monroe's lookalike Jayne Mansfield plays a dumb actress who starts her own production company. Prior to the play's production and premiere, Monroe had told Milton Greene about her grievances with 20th Century Fox, with Greene suggesting that they start their own production company. Announcing its foundation in a press conference in January 1955, Monroe had stated that she was "tired of the same old sex roles. I want to do better things. People have scope, you know." She had asserted that she was no longer under contract to Fox, as the studio had not fulfilled its duties, such as paying her the promised bonus for The Seven Year Itch. This would begin a year-long legal battle between her and the studio, that saw her being ridiculed by the press and by this play, Will Success Spoil Rock Hunter?, which was written by The Seven Year Itch writer George Axelrod.
 Blood Brothers (1983): three songs called "Marilyn Monroe"
 Wilhelm Reich in Hell (1987) by Robert Anton Wilson: Monroe is a character
 Nobody Dies on Friday (1998) by Robert Brustein: About Lee Strasberg and the Actors Studio, with Monroe as a supporting character

Video games
 Bernard of Hollywood's Marilyn: A biography game for the PC CD-Rom
 Bill & Ted's Excellent Video Game Adventure: A pic of Monroe can be seen in a phone book with the numbers 555–1155 in blue and the numbers 555–1764 in red
 Bugs Bunny: Lost in Time: A sorcerer named Merlin Munroe is a pun on Marilyn Monroe
 Discworld II: Mortality Bytes!: The Milkmaid (a Marilyn Monroe look a like) stands on a grate as her dress billows up
 Double Dragon V: The Shadow Falls: An undead skeleton character named Bones has one of his likes in Marrowlyn Monroe, a parody of her name.
 Final Fight Revenge: Poison in a light pink dress apes the Marilyn Monroe pose from The Seven Year Itch.
 Gigi: The girl on the backglass cover is supposed to resemble Marilyn Monroe
 Hard Evidence: The Marilyn Monroe Files: Four characters (the cop, the lawyer, the coroner and the investigative reporter) try to investigate her tragic death from a different angle to get to the truth.
 Hisshou Pachinko *Pachi-Slot Kouryoku Series Vol 3: CR Marilyn Monroe: Translated as Winning Pachinko Mari ly N Monroe, a virtually marine-themed paci-slot game, features Monroe. A PlayStation 2 version was released under the title CR Marilyn Monroe.
 Shinobi (1987): Posters of Monroe can be found plastered on a wall in the second third of the first level.
 Taxi (pinball game) (1988): A blonde Marilyn Monroe-like image in a red dress can be seen as a taxi passenger in both the backglass and playfield. But due to copyright infringement at the time, she was later changed to a brunette woman named Lola
 Jigoku no Renshuu: Translated as Hell of Exercises, Monroe wearing a white choker makes an appearance in the game
 The Joker's Wild (1994): A Marilyn Monroe-type personality photo can be seen in the category "Sex Symbols".
 Kantai Collection: 's standard pose of pushing her skirt down as it's blown upward by wind is inspired by a famous and iconic pose by Marilyn Monroe, taken from the movie The Seven Year Itch.
 Yo-kai Watch 2: An in-game version of Marilyn Monroe called "Mary Ronmo", who starred in the movie "Gentlemen Endure Prawns", a spoof of Gentlemen Prefer Blondes. A sidequest involves finding her famous red dress, which she wore in a scene in which her dress was blown upwards.

See also
 Marilyn Monroe filmography

References

Works cited

External links
 Tate Collection, Marilyn Diptych by Andy Warhol
 Hefner to be Buried With Monroe June 24, 2007
 "A New Marilyn Monroe Script Helps Plot 'Augmented Reality'" Investor's Business Daily via finance.yahoo.com  February 19, 2010

Monroe, Marilyn
Popular Culture